Charles Guy Cargill (May 24, 1846 - June 18, 1900) served in the California State Assembly for the 59th district and 68th district and, during the American Civil War, he served in the United States Army.

References

External links

Union Army personnel
19th-century American politicians
Republican Party members of the California State Assembly
1846 births
1900 deaths